The Brass Action was a Canadian six-piece independent band from Vancouver, British Columbia. The band played a unique style that mixes the intensity of punk rock and rockabilly with the dancy, horn driven sounds of ska.

History
The Brass Action formed in 2007 in Vancouver, BC, and have since released three independent full-length albums.

The band's first album, entitled Making Waves (2013), was recorded over a three-year period and serves as a compilation of EP albums released during that time. The album was recorded and engineered by Paul Boechler at Fader Mountain Sound and Armoury Studios in Vancouver, BC. Mastering was done by Brock McFarlane at CPS Mastering.

Two songs from their album Making Waves were featured in the 2014 film Horns, starring Daniel Radcliffe. The band performs "The Devil Down Below" live in the film, with Joe Anderson's character playing lead trumpet. Their song "11:34 (Hell O'Clock)" is also used as background music. Singer Ryan Clare has a speaking role in the film. Lakeshore Records released an original soundtrack for Horns, including "The Devil Down Below" with other tracks by David Bowie, The Pixies, The Eels, The Flaming Lips and Marilyn Manson.

"The Devil Down Below" was also included on DyingScene.com's free compilation album Skaface: Evolution, alongside The Mad Caddies, Big D and The Kids Table, Mustard Plug and The Resignators.

The Brass Action released their second album, No Soundcheck, in 2015. Their first single off the album, "Moonlite", was released in 2014, and tracks "Nothing to See Here" and "Good Intentions, Wong Direction" were included on subsequent volumes of an, independently released, compilation album series entitled Pacific Sound System. The compilation album series features a collection of bands from the Pacific Northwest region of North America, such as The Dreadnoughts, Easy Big Fella and Los Furios.

The Brass Action's third album, Brouhaha, was released in 2019. Their first single off the album, "Wreckless", was released in 2018, and tracks "It's Not Me, It's You" and "Political Shitposting" were included on a split album, with the Vancouver punk band, Indications, entitled Tall Boys. The Brass Action's track "IDWTKYWMBKL" was included on the third volume of the Pacific Sound System compilation album series. Their track "The Foyer" was included on Punkcouver Volume 3, which is part of a series of compilation albums, released by Vancouver promoter, Rocket from Russia, to highlight prominent bands in the local Vancouver punk scene.

The Brass Action has supported many notable acts, including The Planet Smashers, Mad Caddies,  The Interrupters, The Toasters, Chris Murray, Kobo Town, The Beatdown, K-man and the 45's, The Fundamentals, Los Furios, Brehdren, The Elixxxirs, Antiparty, The Bone Daddies and Rude City Riot. On July 2, 2014, the band  performed at the 15th annual Victoria Ska Festival, sharing the stage with a number of internationally acclaimed acts such as Shaggy, The Aggrolites, Barrington Levy, Lynval Golding and Fishbone.

Band members

Current
Ryan Clare – lead vocals, guitar
Richard Mitchell – trumpet, backing vocals
Tyson Sully – trombone
Kieron Rhys Lillo – bass, backing vocals
Bradley Young - tenor saxophone
Derek Simpson – drums

Past
Mael Thébault - tenor saxophone, backing vocals
Evan Kelly – drums
Garrett McLaughlin – bass, backing vocals
Mark Myskiw – drums, backing vocals
Alan Keelan – piano
William Shand (former member of The Dreadnoughts) – bass, backing vocals

Timeline

Discography

Studio albums
 Making Waves, Independent, 2013
 No Soundcheck, Independent, 2015
 Brouhaha, Independent, 2019

EPs and singles
"Now THIS is Happening", Independent, 2011
"11:34 (Hell O'Clock)", Independent, 2012
"Moonlite", Independent, 2014
"Wreckless", Independent, 2017
"Tall Boys", Independent, 2018

Compilation albums
Skaface: Evolution, "The Devil Down Below", Dying Scene Records, 2013
Pacific Sound System, Vol 1, "Nothing To See Here", Independent, 2014
Horns (Original Motion Picture Soundtrack), "The Devil Down Below", Lakeshore Records, 2014
Pacific Sound System, Vol 2, "Good Intentions, Bad Direction", Independent, 2015
What Do You Know About Ska Punk? Vol. 2, "Wreckless", WDYKASP, 2018 
Pacific Sound System, Vol 3, "IDWTKYWMBKL", Independent, 2018
What Do You Know About Ska Punk? Vol. 3, "It's Not Me It's You", WDYKASP, 2019 
Punkcouver, Vol 3, "The Foyer", Rocket From Russia, 2019

Videography

Films
 Horns includes a live performance of the song "Devil Down Below" and background use of the song "11:34 (Hell O'clock)" from the album Making Waves. Singer Ryan Clare has a speaking role.

Music videos
 "The Devil Down Below" (2014)
 "11:34 (Hell O'Clock)" (2014)
 "Nothing To See Here" (2014)
 "Brasser and the Business" (2015)
 "Good Intentions, Wrong Direction" (2016)
 "Seeing Red" (2016)
 "Box Wine" (2016)
 "Wreckless" (2017)
 "Good Intentions, Wrong Direction" (2018)
 "Hero of the Proletariat" (2019)
 "Disposable Razors" (2019)
 "Political Party" (2019)
 "7-Eleven was a Part-Time Job" (2020)
 "IDWTKYWMBKL" (2020)

References

Canadian punk rock groups
Canadian ska groups
Musical groups from Vancouver
Third-wave ska groups
Musical groups established in 2007
2007 establishments in British Columbia